Ernest Mengel (27 March 1913 – 16 December 1968) was a Luxembourgian footballer. He competed in the men's tournament at the 1936 Summer Olympics.

References

External links
 
 

1913 births
1968 deaths
Luxembourgian footballers
Luxembourg international footballers
Olympic footballers of Luxembourg
Footballers at the 1936 Summer Olympics
People from Dudelange
Association football forwards